The African News Agency (ANA) is a news and content syndication service, focusing on news about Africa written by Africans for an African and international audience.

ANA was launched in Cape Town in February 2015 by Sekunjalo Investments Chair and Executive Chairman of Independent Media, Dr Iqbal Survé, and the Chairman of the Pan African Business Forum, Ladislas Agbesi, following the liquidation of the South African Press Association (SAPA), previously a major supplier of foreign and domestic news in South Africa.

Controversies
In February 2021 during testimony at The Judicial Commission of Inquiry into Allegations of State Capture, Sydney Mufamadi testified that the State Security Agency (South Africa) had paid R20 million to the ANA to publish articles favorable to then President Jacob Zuma. The payments were confirmed by ANA CEO Vasantha Angamuthu, however, she denied any wrongdoing on ANA's part. Angamuthu emphasised that ANA was neither aware of any sinister motive by the SSA nor did they participate in any business outside of the company's key focus, i.e. driving growth and development on the African continent using media.  The final Zondo report was released on 22 June 2022 and made no adverse findings against ANA.

See also
Africanews

References

External links
 

Mass media in Cape Town
News agencies based in South Africa
Pan-Africanism
Mass media companies established in 2015
Companies based in Cape Town
South African companies established in 2015